Ippolito Vicentini (18 June 1638 – 20 June 1702) was a Roman Catholic prelate who served as Bishop of Rieti (1670–1702).

Biography
Ippolito Vicentini was born in Rieti, Italy on 18 Jun 1638 and ordained a priest on 21 September 1670.
On 22 December 1670, he was appointed during the papacy of Pope Clement X as Bishop of Rieti.
On 11 January 1671, he was consecrated bishop by Gasparo Carpegna, Titular Archbishop of Nicaea, with Federico Baldeschi Colonna, Titular Archbishop of Caesarea in Cappadocia, and Francesco de' Marini, Bishop of Molfetta, serving as co-consecrators. 
He served as Bishop of Rieti until his death on 20 June 1702.

References

External links and additional sources
 (for Chronology of Bishops) 
 (for Chronology of Bishops) 

17th-century Italian Roman Catholic bishops
18th-century Italian Roman Catholic bishops
Bishops appointed by Pope Clement X
1638 births
1702 deaths